12.7mm Nasr sniper rifle, Weapons designed and built by Iranian experts is ordered by the IRGC Ground Forces.

The Nasr is essentially a locally produced Russian OSV 96 anti-materiel rifle, also in 12.7x108mm. Photos of the Anti-Matter Rifle appeared at last year's IPAS 2016, but this is the first official announcement of the Anti-Matter Rifle.

The new weapon is characterized by high accuracy and high firepower.

See also 
 Gatling gun

References 

Islamic Revolutionary Guard Corps